Shore Road Historic District is a national historic district located at Cold Spring Harbor in Suffolk County, New York.  The district has 20 contributing residential buildings.  They sit at the foot of a steep wooded bluff and date from the early 19th century, the oldest dating to about 1790.  It includes works by architect Grosvenor Atterbury.

It was added to the National Register of Historic Places in 1985.

References

External links
Shore Road Historic District Map (Living Places)

National Register of Historic Places in Huntington (town), New York
Historic districts on the National Register of Historic Places in New York (state)
Queen Anne architecture in New York (state)
Federal architecture in New York (state)
Historic districts in Suffolk County, New York